Eugene Franklin Skinner (September 13, 1809 – December 15, 1864) was an early American settler in Oregon and the founder of the city of Eugene, Oregon, which is named after him.

Skinner was born in Essex, New York. His father was Major John Joseph Skinner and his brother was St John Skinner, assistant postmaster under President Andrew Johnson. His mother died while Skinner was young. At age 14, Skinner moved with his family to Green County, Wisconsin. As an adult, Skinner lived in Plattsburgh, New York briefly before settling in Hennepin, Illinois as county sheriff. He married Mary Cook on November 28, 1839.

In May 1845, he and his wife Mary Cook Skinner traveled overland to California, wintering at Sutter's Fort. In 1846, the Skinners headed north to the Oregon Country, joining the party of Elijah Bristow in exploring the Willamette Valley south of present-day Polk County, Oregon. Skinner took a claim downriver of Bristow's claim, and was advised by the local Kalapuya Indian tribe to build high up due to floods. Following this advice, he built his first cabin on the hill known as Skinner Butte.

The Skinners farmed and raised a family of five children: four daughters (Mary, Leonora, Phoebe, and Amelia) and one son, St John. Skinner operated a ferry service across the Willamette River. Historian Robert Clark suggests that Skinner deliberately chose the land he claimed because it was the best location for a local ferry monopoly. After Oregon was organized as a US territory in 1849, Skinner became the local postmaster.

In 1851, Skinner and local judge David Matteson Risdon laid out the town of Eugene City (shortened to "Eugene" in 1889). Skinner donated a portion of his property for county buildings, and took up practicing law, serving as a county clerk and trustee for Eugene City.

Skinner took ill after trying to save his cattle during a flood in 1861, and suffered ill health for the last few years of his life before dying in Eugene on December 15, 1864. He is buried in the Masonic Cemetery in Eugene.

See also
 Statue of Eugene Skinner, installed outside the Eugene Public Library

References

External links

Eugene Skinner sculpture representation, in Building Oregon: Architecture of Oregon & the Pacific Northwest, University of Oregon database

1809 births
1864 deaths
Illinois sheriffs
Oregon pioneers
Oregon postmasters
Lawyers from Eugene, Oregon
People from Essex, New York
People from Plattsburgh, New York
People from Hennepin, Illinois
19th-century American lawyers